The following is a list of fictional atheists and agnostics limited to notable characters who have, either through self-admission within canon works or through admission of the character creator(s), been associated with a disbelief in a supreme deity or follow an agnostic approach toward religious matters.

Literature

Comics

Video games

Film

Television shows

Animated television shows

Live action television shows

References

 
Fictional